James Patrick Mallory (born October 25, 1945) is an American archaeologist and Indo-Europeanist. Mallory is an emeritus professor at Queen's University, Belfast; a member of the Royal Irish Academy, and the former editor of the Journal of Indo-European Studies and Emania: Bulletin of the Navan Research Group (Belfast).

Career
J. P. Mallory was born in San Bernardino, California on October 25, 1945, the son of Clyde Francis and Rosemarie Mallory. Mallory received his A.B. in History from Occidental College in California in 1967, then served three years in the US Army as a military police sergeant. He received his Ph.D. in Indo-European studies from UCLA in 1975 under the supervision of Marija Gimbutas. Together with Gimbutas, Edgar C. Polomé and other Indo-Europeanists, Mallory was involved in the founding of the Journal of Indo-European Studies.

Selected publications

Books

Edited volumes
J. P. Mallory & Brian M. Fagan, eds. The Oxford Companion to Archaeology. New York & Oxford: Oxford University Press, 1996.

See also
 David W. Anthony
 C. Scott Littleton
 A. Richard Diebold Jr.
 Jaan Puhvel

References

Sources

External links

, University of Pennsylvania Museum (video)

1945 births
Academics of Queen's University Belfast
American archaeologists
Indo-Europeanists
Living people
Occidental College alumni
United States Army soldiers
University of California, Los Angeles alumni